Mitten im Leben is a German pseudo-documentary drama-reality television series.

See also
List of German television series

External links
 

2007 German television series debuts
2013 German television series endings
German-language television shows
RTL (German TV channel) original programming
Television articles with disputed naming style